USCGC Wachusett (WHEC-44) was an Owasco-class high endurance cutter built for World War II service with the United States Coast Guard. She was commissioned too late for service in that war and consequently did not see wartime service until the Vietnam War.

Wachusett was built by Western Pipe & Steel at the company's San Pedro shipyard. Named after Wachusett Lake, Massachusetts, she was commissioned as a patrol gunboat with ID number WPG-44 on 23 March 1946. Her ID was later changed to WHEC-44 (HEC for "High Endurance Cutter" - the "W" signifies a Coast Guard vessel).

Peacetime service
Wachusett was originally named Huron. Throughout 1946, she was stationed at Port Angeles, Washington, and used for law enforcement, ocean station, and search and rescue operations in the Pacific. For the next two years, she was homeported at Juneau, Alaska, and added Bering Sea patrol to the list of her duties.

From 1949 to 30 August 1973, she was stationed at Seattle, Washington, and returned to her initial three major areas of operations. On 12 May 1957, she rescued two crew members from a USAF B-57 when they bailed out between Honolulu and San Francisco. On 11 February 1958, she assisted the tug USS Yuma in towing the USS Tinian 10 miles west-southwest of Cape Flattery. On 14 April 1964, Wachusett rescued four persons from F/V Mary Carol east of Chiniak Bay, Alaska
.

Wachusett stood by the disabled Chinese MV Taihsing in the North Pacific from 18 to 22 May 1964 until a commercial tug arrived. On 19 August 1964, she located the barge Lumberjack adrift off California. On 5 June 1965, she seized the Japanese FV Wakashio Maru for violation of the 1953 International Fishing Convention east of 175°W.

Vietnam War
Wachusett was assigned to Coast Guard Squadron Three, South Vietnam, from 10 September 1968 to 1 June 1969.

Decommissioning
The ship was decommissioned on 30 August 1973 and sold for scrap on November 18, 1974.
U.S. Coast Guard machinery mate Russell E. Humphrey was one of the ship crew who helped decommission (WHEC 44).

Footnotes

References
 Wachusett WHEC-44, United States' Coast Guard website.
 Scheina, Robert L.: U.S. Coast Guard Cutters & Craft of World War II Annapolis: Naval Institute Press, 1981, pp. 1–3.
 Scheina, Robert L.: U.S. Coast Guard Cutters & Craft, 1946-1990 Annapolis: Naval Institute Press, 1990, pp. 18–26.

 

Owasco-class cutters
Ships of the United States Coast Guard
Vietnam War patrol vessels of the United States
Ships built in Los Angeles
1944 ships